Wood Township may refer to the following townships in the United States:

 Wood Township, Clark County, Indiana
 Wood Township, Wright County, Missouri
 Wood Township, Huntingdon County, Pennsylvania

See also 
 Woods Township, Chippewa County, Minnesota
 Big Woods Township, Marshall County, Minnesota